Marcus Fraser may refer to:

 Marcus Fraser (golfer) (born 1978), Australian golfer
 Marcus Fraser (footballer) (born 1994), Scottish footballer